The 2006 BA-CA-TennisTrophy was a tennis tournament played on indoor hard courts. It was the 32nd edition of the event known that year as the BA-CA-TennisTrophy, and was part of the International Series Gold of the 2006 ATP Tour. It took place at the Wiener Stadthalle in Vienna, Austria, from 9 October through 15 October 2006.

Finals

Singles

 Ivan Ljubičić defeated  Fernando González, 6–3, 6–4, 7–5
It was Ivan Ljubičić's 3rd title of the year, and his 6th overall.

Doubles

 Petr Pála /  Pavel Vízner defeated  Julian Knowle /  Jürgen Melzer, 6–4, 3–6, [12–10]

References

External links
 Official website
 ATP tournament profile

BA-CA-TennisTrophy
Vienna Open
2006 in Austrian tennis